The Bike Shed Motorcycle Club is a private members club with branches in London and Los Angeles. Described as a "social club for motorcycle enthusiasts", it was founded by Anthony "Dutch" van Someren. The Bike Shed is best known for hosting an annual exhibition of custom motorcycles in Tobacco Dock, London.

London Club 
Prior to founding the Shoreditch-based Club, founder, Van Someren ran a motorcycle news blog aggregator under the domain name BikeShedMotorcycleClub.com. The Bike Shed shows were founded in response to the perceived poor quality of British motorcycle exhibitions. Van Someren developed the concept of the private member's club after their second show was well received.

The founders envisaged Bike Shed as a "Soho House for Bikers", attracting a younger demographic than traditional motorcycle-friendly venues. Proposals to open the facility were initially opposed by the Shoreditch Community Association and the Shoreditch Town Hall Trust. The club in Shoreditch was opened in November 2015 in three railway arches adjacent to Old Street.

The Old Street venue was opened with the support of British TV presenter Charley Boorman, and is now considered to be one of the UK's best motorcycling social venues. Despite objections, Hackney Council granted the club a license to serve alcoholic drinks to members until midnight. In 2019 the club installed the UK's first motorcycle-only recharging points.

Bike Shed community response 
During the 2020 Coronavirus lock-down, Bikeshed organized a volunteer courier-style service in which its members helped deliver food and medical supplies to patients at home.

Los Angeles Club 
The Los Angeles facility, originally due to open in Autumn 2020 will be based in the city's Arts District. When finally open, the new facility will include a restaurant, cafe, bar and lounge, a barbershop, tattoo studio, events and retails space.

Exhibitions 
The annual Bike Shed Motorcycle Show takes place at Tobacco Dock. It is considered to be the UK's largest exhibition of custom motorcycles. In 2018 the exhibition featured 230 motorcycles including track-bikes and custom-built machines.

Festival 
The first Bike Shed Festival took place in October 2019, at Lydden Hill Race Circuit, billed as a day to introduce new motorcyclists to track riding.

References 

Clubs and societies in London
Motorcycle clubs in the United Kingdom
Shoreditch